Tsepelyovo is a rural locality (a village) in Klyazminskoye Rural Settlement, Kovrovsky District, Vladimir Oblast, Russia. The population was 20 as of 2010.

Geography 
Tsepelyovo is located 15 km east of Kovrov (the district's administrative centre) by road. Skomorokhovo is the nearest rural locality.

References 

Rural localities in Kovrovsky District